Croatto is a surname. Notable people with the surname include:

 Mara Croatto (born 1969), Puerto Rican actress
 Silvia Croatto (born 1973), Italian volleyball player
 Tony Croatto (1940–2005), Italian singer and composer